Glaucus atlanticus (common names include the blue sea dragon, sea swallow, blue angel,  blue glaucus, dragon slug, blue dragon, blue sea slug and blue ocean slug) is a species of small, blue sea slug, a pelagic (open-ocean) aeolid nudibranch, a shell-less gastropod mollusk in the family Glaucidae.

These sea slugs are pelagic; they float upside down by using the surface tension of the water to stay up, where they are carried along by the winds and ocean currents. G. atlanticus makes use of countershading: the blue side of their body faces upwards, blending in with the blue of the water. The silver/grey side of the sea slugs faces downwards, blending in with the sunlight reflecting on the ocean's surface when viewed facing upwards underwater.

Glaucus atlanticus feed on other pelagic creatures, including the Portuguese man o' war and other venomous siphonophores. This sea slug stores stinging nematocysts from the siphonophores within its own tissues as defence against predators. Humans handling the slug may receive a very painful and potentially dangerous sting.

Taxonomy
This species looks similar to, and is closely related to, G. marginatus, which is now understood to be not one species, but a cryptic species complex of four separate species that live in the Indian Ocean and Pacific Ocean. It shares the common name "blue dragon" with Pteraeolidia ianthina and G. marginatus.

Description 
It can live up to a year under the right conditions. It is silvery grey on its dorsal side and dark and pale blue ventrally. It has dark blue stripes on its head. It has a flat, tapering body and six appendages that branch out into rayed, finger-like cerata.

Cerata, also known as papillae, extend laterally from three different pairs of peduncles. The papillae are placed in a single row (uniseriate) and may be up to 84 inches total, (Forster, 1777).

Glaucus atlanticus is usually found in tropical/subtropical areas, floating at the ocean's surface due to the stored gulped air inside their stomachs. They usually feed on cnidarians, which can be noisy due to air escaping their stomachs as they feed.

The radula of this species bears serrated teeth which, paired with a strong jaw and denticles, allows it to grasp and "chip down" parts of its prey.

Buoyancy and coloration

With the aid of a gas-filled sac in its stomach, G. atlanticus floats at the surface. Due to the location of the gas sac, this species floats upside down. The upper surface is actually the foot (the underside in other slugs and snail), and this has either a blue or blue-white coloration. The true dorsal surface (carried downwards in G. atlanticus) is completely silver-grey. This coloration is an example of countershading, which helps protect it from predators that might attack from below and from above. The blue coloration is also thought to reflect harmful UV sunlight.

Distribution and habitat 

This nudibranch is pelagic, and there is some evidence that it occurs throughout the world's oceans, in temperate and tropical waters. It has been recorded from the east and south coasts of South Africa, European waters, the east coast of Australia, and Mozambique. The G. atlanticus species geographical range increased northward by 150 km in the Gulf of California.

Since the middle of the 19th century, records of this species have been reported on the Azores.

Glaucus atlanticus was recently found in the Humboldt Current ecosystem in Peru in 2013, and off Andhra Pradesh in India in 2012. This is in line with the known habitat characteristics of the species: they thrive in warm temperate climates in the Southern Pacific, and in circumtropical and Lusitanian environments. Before finding G. atlanticus off Andhra Pradesh, these nudibranchs were documented as having been seen in the Bay of Bengal and off the coast of Tamil Nadu, India, over 677 kilometers apart.   Glaucus atlanticus was also recently found off Bermuda in January 2016, and uncommonly washes ashore on east coast beaches at Barbados, Lesser Antilles.

Although these sea slugs live on the open ocean, they sometimes accidentally wash up onto the shore, and therefore they may be found on beaches. In April 2022, specimens were found in the Gulf of Mexico along the Texas coast.

Life history and behavior 
Glaucus atlanticus preys on other larger pelagic organisms. The sea slugs can move toward prey or mates by using their cerata to make slow swimming movements. They are known to prey on the dangerously venomous Portuguese man o' war (Physalia physalis); the by-the-wind-sailor (Velella velella); the blue button (Porpita porpita); and the violet snail, Janthina janthina. Occasionally, individuals attack and eat other individuals in captivity.

The species is able to feed on the Portuguese man o' war due to its immunity to the venomous nematocysts. The slug consumes chunks of the organism and appears to select and store the most venomous nematocysts for its own use against future prey. The nematocysts are collected in specialized sacs (cnidosacs) at the tip of the animal's cerata, the thin feather-like "fingers" on its body. Because G. atlanticus concentrates the venom, it can produce a more powerful and deadly sting than the man o' war on which it feeds.

Like almost all heterobranchs, blue dragons are hermaphrodites and their male reproductive organs have evolved to be especially large and hooked to avoid their partner's venomous cerata. Unlike most nudibranchs, which mate with their right sides facing, sea swallows mate with ventral sides facing. After mating, both individuals are able to lay eggs and can release up to 20 on an egg string, often laying them in wood pieces or carcasses. On average, G. atlanticus can lay 55 egg strings per hour. Studies have indicated that the G. atlanticus is not globally panmictic, but is localized within ocean basins. Gene flow among Afro-Eurasian and American populations is thus hindered by physical obstructions and water temperatures in the Arctic and Southern Oceans.

Sting 
Glaucus atlanticus is able to swallow the venomous nematocysts from siphonophores such as the Portuguese man o' war, and store them in the extremities of its finger-like cerata. Picking up the animal can result in a painful sting, with symptoms similar to those caused by the Portuguese man o' war. The symptoms that may appear after being stung are nausea, pain, vomiting, acute allergic contact dermatitis, erythema, urticarial papules, potential vesicle formation and post-inflammatory hyperpigmentation.

References

Further reading

External links 

 Sea Slug Forum
 
 

Glaucidae
Molluscs described in 1777